Park Yu-yeon (born 20 December 1998) is a South Korean professional baseball catcher who is currently playing for the Doosan Bears of the KBO League. He made his first hit in his debut game on 1 July 2017.

References

External links 

 Career statistics and player information from the KBO League
 Park Yu-yeon at Doosan Bears Baseball Club

1998 births
Living people
Sportspeople from Gwangju
South Korean baseball players
KBO League catchers
Doosan Bears players